Anouk Is Alive is a live 2-CD/DVD release by the Dutch pop rock singer Anouk, covering a concert held on 3 and 4 December 2005, in Ahoy, Rotterdam, Netherlands. The DVD went gold in the first week of release.

Track listing

CD
Disc 1
"Love"
"Only You"
"One Word"
"Alright"
"More Than You Deserve"
"Don't"
"R U Kiddin' Me"
"Falling Sun"
"Sacrifice"
"Flower Duet"
"Who Cares"
"Too Long"
"No Time to Waste"
"The Dark"
"Everything"

Disc 2
"Hail"
"Searching"
"Jerusalem"
"I Live for You"
"Michel"
"Our Own Love"
"Graduated Fool"
"It's So Hard"
"Nobody's Wife"
"Home Is in My Head"
"Girl"
"Lost"

DVD
Disc 1
"Love"
"Only You"
"One Word"
"Alright"
"More Than You Deserve"
"Don't"
"R U Kiddin' Me"
"Falling Sun"
"Sacrifice"
"Flower Duet"
"Who Cares"
"Too Long"
"No Time to Waste"
"The Dark"
"Everything"
"Hail"
"Searching"
"Jerusalem"
"I Live for You"

Disc 2
"Michel"
"Our Own Love"
"Graduated Fool"
"It's So Hard"
"Nobody's Wife"
"Home Is in My Head"
"Girl"
"Lost"

Special Edition
Backstage Documentary
"Girl" [Music Video]
"Lost" [Music Video]
"Jerusalem" [Music Video]
"One Word" [Music Video]

Charts

References

Anouk (singer) live albums
2006 live albums
2006 video albums
Live video albums
EMI Records live albums
EMI Records video albums